Timus may refer to:

 Thyme, a culinary and medicinal herb
 Timuş, a village in Avrămeni Commune, Botoşani County, Romania

See also:

 Thymus, an organ of the immune system